This is the discography of Taiwanese pop singer Teresa Teng.

Mandarin Chinese discography

Studio albums 
 Yeu Jow Records 
 1967  (Feng Yang Hua Gu) 
 1967  (Xinteng de Xiao Baobao)
 1967  (Heihei a Gege)
 1968  (Biyiniao)
 1968  (Changyin Yibeio)
 1968  (Yijian Ni Jiu Xiao)
 1968  (Di Qi Ji)
 1968  (Di Jiu Ji)
 1968  (Shengdan Kuaile - Jing He Xinxi)
 1968  (Zai Hui Ba! Shiqi Sui)
 1969  (Di Shier Ji; Twelfth Album)
 1969  (Xiexie Zong Jingli)
 1970  (Hua de Meng / Tan Qing Shihou)
 1970  (Lian Ai de Lu Duome Tian)
 1970  (Meigui Guniang)
 1970  (Miren de Xiaojie)
 1971  (X+Y Jiushi Ai)
 1971  (Hebi Liu Xia Huiyi / He Chu Shi Wo Guicheng)

 Hai Shan Records 
 1971  (Wo de Aiqing Xiang Xingxing - Shui Lai Tongqing Wo)
 1971  (Denglijun Hongdong Minnan Yu Gequ)
 1971  (Kuaile de Qiaqia Guniang)
 1975  (Zaijian, Wo de Airen (You Ming: Jiu Zheyang Yueding)) (Goodbye My Love)

 Life Records 
 1971  (Aiqing 1,2,3 / Taibei Guniang)
 1971  (Denglijun Zhi Ge)
 1971  (Nanwang de Chulian Gingren/ Mai Rou Zong)
 1972  (Dang Wo Yijing Zhidao Ai, Na Nu Wa Qingge)
 1973  (Di Yi Ci Jian Dao Ni / Qing Hua)
 1973  (Shaonian Ai Guniang / Shui Shi Xinshangren)
 1973  (Bei Ai Di Meng)
 1974  (Qingshan Lu Shui Wo He Ni)
 1975  (Meiyou Ai Zenme Huo / Yong Xiangai)
 1976  (Xinzhong Xihuan Jiu Shuo Ai/ Wo Jiushi Ai Ni)
 1976  (1976 Nan You Teji: Feng de Chuanshuo)

 Polygram Records / Kolin Records 
Albums by Kolin Records with different names are listed separately.

 1975  (Goodbye My Love) (Daoguo Zhi Qingge: Zaijian, Wo de Airen)
 1976  (Daoguo Zhi Qingge Di Er Ji: Jinye Xiangqi Ni / Lei de Xiaoyu)
 1977  (Daoguo Zhi Qingge Di San Ji: Si Si Xiaoyu)
Kolin Titled:   (Yun Shenqing Ye Shen)
 1977  (Daoguo Zhi Qingge Di Si Ji: Xianggang Zhi Lian) 
Kolin Titled:  (Xiaocun Zhi Lian)
 1978  (Daoguo Zhi Qingge Di Wu Ji: Shi Aiqing Geng Meili, You Jian Chuiyan) 
Kolin Titled:  (Wuqing Huangdi Youqing Tian)
 1978  (Yī fēng qíngshū) 
 1979  (Daoguo Zhi Qingge Di Liu Ji: Xiaocheng Gushi)
 1979  (Tian Mi Mi)
 1980  (Zai Shui Yifang)
Kolin Titled:  (Yan Hong Xiaoqu)
 1980  (Yi Ge Xiao Xin Yuan)
Kolin Titled:  (Wang Buliao)
 1980  (Yuan Xiangqing Nong) 
 1981  (Shuishang Ren) 
 1981  (Fujian Mingqu Zhuanji)
 1981  (Love Songs of the Island-Nation, Vol. 7: If I Were for Real) 
 1981  (Ai Xiang Yi Shou Ge) 
 1982  (Chu Ci Chang Dao Ji Mo)
 1983  (Dandan Youqing) 
 1984  (Daoguo Zhi Qingge Di Ba Ji: Ai de Shizhe)
 1985  (Chánghuán)
 1987  (Wǒ zhǐ zàihū nǐ)

EPs
 1972  (Haitang Guniang/ Xiangrikui)

Compilation albums
Unless it has new songs or new re-recordings of old songs, a compilation is not listed here. Also, these English translations of non-English albums are unofficial; some albums may be impossible to accurately translate.
 1970  (Cai Hong Ling, Qianyan Wan Yu)
 1970  (Zuoye Meng Xing Shi)
 1970  (Quan Shi Ge)
 1971  (Jishi Zai Huitou)
 1977  (Denglijun Changxiao Gequ Di Yi Ji)
 1977  (Jin Changpian) 
 1977 Greatest Hits
 1977  Greatest Hits Vol. 2
 1982 Greatest Hits Vol. 3
 1983 15  (Shiwu Zhounian) 
 1984  (Leishe Daoguo Qingge Jingxuan Denglijun)
 1985  (Mingqu Xuan)
 1986  (Huaijiu Mingqu Xuan)
 1986  (Huaijiu Mingqu Xuan Di Er Ji)
 1992  Teresa Teng (Nan Wan De Teresa Teng)

Other albums (soundtracks, etc.)
 1968  (Diu Diu Tong)
 1969  (Jing Jing)
 1972  (Tianxia Yi Da Xiao)
 1972  (Feng Cong Nali lai / Yue Xia Song Jun)
 1972  (Ni Ke Zhidao Wo Ai Shui)
 1973  (Caiyun Fei)
 1973  (Dang Wo Yijing Zhidao Ai / Na Nu Wa Gingge)
 1973  (Ba Ai Maicang Zai Xinwo)
 1974  (Hai Yun)
 1974  (Jinshuiloutai)
 1974  (Shui lianyi / You Shui Zhidao Wo)
 1976  (Gui Ma Qiao Yisheng)
 1980  (Yuan Xiangren)

Concert albums
 1970  (Yijian Ni Jiu Xiao)
 1970  (Lei de Xiaoyu)
 1970  (Jishi Zai Huitou)
 1982  (Yanchang Hui Shikuang Luyin)
 1983 Encore (Denglijun Yanchang Hui Encore)

Compilations after her death 
 1995 
 1995 Forever Star
 1996 
 1997 The Way We Were
 2001 Inoubliable
 2001 
 2002 
 2003 
 2004 
 2005 
 2005 
 2005 
 2006  The First Completed Compilation
 2008 
 2010 
 2011 Greatest Hits  24K Gold Disc 
 2012 
 2012 
 2013 
 2013 
 2013 
 2014 
 2014 
 2014 
 2014 
 2014 
 2014 
 2014 
 2015 Great Hits 
 2015 
 2015

List of album certifications

Cantonese discography

Studio albums 
 Polygram Records 
 1980  (Sai Bat Leung Laap)

 Polygram Records / Kolin Records
 1983  (Maan Bo Yan Sang Lo)

Japanese discography

Studio albums 
 Polygram Records
 1974  (Kuko/ Yukigesho)
 1975  (Yoru no jōkyaku/ On'na no ikigai)
 1975  (Akashia no yume)
 1976  (Ainosekai)
 1977  (Furusato wa dokodesu ka)
 1977  (Anata to ikiru)
 1978  (Nesshō! Tōkyō yakei)
 1978  (Kokoro ni nokoru yoru no uta)
 1980  (Enka no messēji)
 1980  (Anata / Ma go koro)
 1981  (Jerusomīna no Bu Ita michi)

 Taurus Records 
 1983  (Tabibito)
 1984  (Tsugunai)
 1984  (Shōkan)
 1985  (Aijin)
 1986  (Tokinonagarenimiwomakase)
 1986  (Sake yo-teki sagu hoko)
 1987  (Wakarenoyokan)
 1989  (Roman shugi)
 1991  (91 Kanashimitoodorasete 〜 New Original Songs 〜)

Compilation albums 
 1976 Best Hit Album
 1976 Perfect 24
 1977 Golden Double Deluxe 
 1978 Best · Karaoke Collection
 1979  (Kareinaru nesshō)
 1980 Best & Best
 1984 Teresa Teng
 1985 Best 20
 1985 Original Best Hits 
 1985 Best Selection 
 1985 Original Best Selection
 1986 Best Selection  (tokinonagarenimiwomakase)
 1986  (Zenkyoku-shū)
 1987 Top Ten
 1988 Best Hits '88
 1988  (Saishin Original Best 15)
 1989   (Zenkyoku-shū)
 1990 '90 Best Collection- (Namida no jōken)
 1990  (Zenkyoku-shū - Tsugunai namida no jōken)
 1990  (Uta dōjō)
 1991  (Zenkyoku-shū - Towazugatari)
 1991  (Manatsu no kajitsu / Hana)
 1992 Best Selection '92
 1992  (Zenkyoku-shū '93)
 1993 Best Songs - Single Collection
 1993  (Zenkyoku-shū - anata to tomoni ikite yuku)
 1993 94 Best Selection
 1994   (Zenkyoku-shū)
 1994   (Tsugunai wakarenoyokan)
 1994  (Tokinonagarenimiwomakase Aijin)
 1994 Original Songs  (Wakarenoyokan)
 1994   (Yaraika)
 1994  (Zenkyoku-shū '95)

Concert albums
 1977 First Concert
 1986 Concert Live
 1986 NHK Concert Live 
 1997  / My Way
 1998 Concert Live ("The Power of Love" included)
 1999 Last Concert

Compilations after her death 
 1995 
 1995  Vol.1 
 1995  Vol.2 
 1995  Vol.3 
 1995 Super Selection
 1995 
 1995 The History of Teresa Teng
 1995 
 1995  
 1996  
 1996 Recollection 
 1996 
 1996  
 1996 Go! Go! Teresa
 1996 Singles 
 1996 
 1997 More Go! Go! Teresa
 1997 Best Selection
 1998 
 1998 
 1998 Top Ten 
 1998 Top Ten 
 1998 Top Ten 
 1999 
 2001 
 2002 
 2002 
 2003  50TH ANNIVERSARY
 2003 50th Anniversary Box - Endless Voyage
 2003 
 2004  Complete Single Collection
 2005 
 2005 Memorial Best - 
 2005 The Best
 2006  Best Selection
 2007  Memorial Box
 2007 Single Collection - 
 2008 Best+Best
 2009 
 2010 Duet & Best 
 2012  60 Diamond Best
 2012 Original Collection 
 2013 Cover Song Collection
 2013 Lover's-18 Love Story - 
 2014 The Best 
 2014 
 2014 
 2014 
 2014 
 2015 
 2015 
 2015

Singles

Special singles

Video albums
 2009 DVD-BOX

References

Discographies of Taiwanese artists
Mandopop discographies